Sir John Smedley Crooke (1861 – 13 October 1951) was a British politician. He was Conservative Member of Parliament (MP) for Birmingham Deritend from 1922 to 1929, and from 1931 to 1945. An annual football tournament named the Smedley Crooke Memorial Charity Cup was set up in his name to raise money for blind and visually impaired people. A street in Hopwood, Worcestershire also bears his name.

References

External links 
 

1861 births
1951 deaths
UK MPs 1922–1923
UK MPs 1923–1924
UK MPs 1924–1929
UK MPs 1931–1935
UK MPs 1935–1945
Conservative Party (UK) MPs for English constituencies
Knights Bachelor